Piaski is a village in the administrative district of Gmina Słupia Konecka, within Końskie County, Świętokrzyskie Voivodeship, in south-central Poland.

The village has a population of 140.

References 

Villages in Końskie County